Bersama is a genus of small trees in family Francoaceae.  The genus is distributed across sub-Saharan Africa.

The Plant List includes this genus in family Melianthaceae.

Species
It contains the following species:
 Bersama abyssinica Fresen.
 Bersama lucens (Hochst.) Szyszył.
 Bersama palustris L.Touss.
 Bersama stayneri Phillips
 Bersama swinnyi Phillips
 Bersama swynnertonii Baker f.
 Bersama tysoniana Oliv.
 Bersama yangambiensis L.Touss.

References

Geraniales genera
Francoaceae
Taxonomy articles created by Polbot